Kim Hyo-jong (born June 1, 1994), better known as Dawn and formerly E'Dawn, is a South Korean rapper and singer-songwriter. Dawn is best known as a former rapper and songwriter of the South Korean boy band Pentagon, releasing nine EPs in both Korean and Japanese before his departure from Cube Entertainment in 2018. Dawn also participated in the group Triple H alongside (then) bandmate Hui and labelmate Hyuna for the release of two EPs.

Dawn made his solo debut on November 5, 2019, releasing the single "Money".

Career

2016–2018: Cube Entertainment, Pentagon, and Triple H
Dawn debuted on July 10, 2016, under the name of E'Dawn, with the group Pentagon under Cube Entertainment as a dancer and rapper. The group was formed through a variety show called Pentagon Maker. Despite E'Dawn being eliminated from the program, he was added to the group's final lineup alongside Yan An and Shinwon. E'Dawn contributed to the group's debut EP, Pentagon, as a songwriter, writing lyrics for the tracks "Lukewarm" and "Organic Song", as well as contributing music to the latter. He would continue to write songs and music for the group (including "Runaway" and "Shine") until his departure.

On April 4, 2017, it was announced that E'Dawn would be debuting in a new group called Triple H alongside bandmate Hui and labelmate Hyuna, and the trio would be starring in a new show called Triple H Fun Agency. The group made their debut on May 1, 2017, with the EP 199X. E'Dawn once again contributed as songwriter, writing all tracks including the lead single "365 Fresh". The album reached #4 on the Gaon Album Chart and #10 on the Billboard World Albums Chart. The group released a follow-up EP, Retro Futurism, in 2018. E'Dawn contributed to the lyrics and music for the lead single "Retro Future" alongside the other three tracks on the album.

After E'Dawn announced his relationship with Hyuna in August 2018, Cube Entertainment announced he would be absent from Pentagon's upcoming EP, Thumbs Up!, though he would still be credited as songwriter for "Naughty Boy" and "Skateboard". On September 13, it was announced that Cube had terminated E'Dawn's and Hyuna's contracts, citing that they were unable to maintain trust with them. E'Dawn's departure from Cube and Pentagon was officially confirmed on November 14, 2018.

2019–present: P Nation, debut as Dawn and Dawndididawn
On January 23, Psy announced via Instagram that E'Dawn had signed a contract with his new label, P Nation, alongside Hyuna. On October 18, it was announced that E'Dawn would be redebuting as a soloist under the name "Dawn", with new single "Money" on November 5.

On April 29, 2020, he was a part of the "OLD X NEW (Original Television Soundtrack)" album for the 본격연예 한밤 (Late Night E-News) show, with the song 그건 너 (It's You).

In September 2020, it was announced that Dawn will make a comeback with his first EP Dawndididawn, which was released on October 9, 2020. The title track "Dawndididawn (던디리던)" featured fellow P Nation artist Jessi.

On March 3, he was a part of Demian's new song "LOVE%".

On September 9, Dawn and Hyuna collaborated to release their duet EP 1+1=1.

On June 7, 2022, it was announced that Dawn would be attending the J-Rim Super Nova Festival with Hyuna, taking place on July 2-3, 2022.

On June 8, 2022, Psy, the head of his agency P NATION, released a teaser image announcing Dawn's return on June 16, 2022 with the digital single "Stupid Cool".

On August 29, 2022, P Nation announced that Dawn would be leaving the company after deciding not to renew his contract. On January 30, 2023, it was announced that Dawn had signed a new contract with hip hop label, At Area.

Personal life
On August 2, 2018, Dawn revealed that he has been in a relationship with Hyuna since May 2016. Their engagement was announced on February 3, 2022. In November 2022, Hyuna posted on her Instagram account that the couple had separated.

Discography

Extended plays

Singles

As featured artist

Television soundtracks

Filmography

Television series

Television shows

Notes

References

External links

Living people
People from South Jeolla Province
Pentagon (South Korean band) members
21st-century South Korean male singers
Cube Entertainment artists
Japanese-language singers of South Korea
South Korean male idols
South Korean male pop singers
South Korean male rappers
South Korean hip hop singers
South Korean male singer-songwriters
1994 births